Euthecosomata is a taxonomic unit used to classify sea snails. It is a suborder of the order Pteropoda.

Superfamilies
 Cavolinioidea Gray, 1850 (1815)
 Limacinoidea Gray, 1840

References

 Meisenheimer J. (1905). Pteropoda. Wissenschaftliche Ergebnisse der Deutschen Tiefsee-Expedition auf dem Dampfer "Valdivia" 1898-1899 9(1): 1-314, pl. 1-2
 Bouchet P., Rocroi J.P., Hausdorf B., Kaim A., Kano Y., Nützel A., Parkhaev P., Schrödl M. & Strong E.E. (2017). Revised classification, nomenclator and typification of gastropod and monoplacophoran families. Malacologia. 61(1-2): 1-526

External links
WoRMS info

Gastropod taxonomy
Protostome infraorders